Inverey Castle was a 17th-century tower house, about  west of Braemar, Aberdeenshire, Scotland, near the meeting of the River Dee and the Ey Burn, at Inverey.

History
The castle was burned in 1689, about fifty years after its construction.

Inverey belonged to John Farquharson of Inverey, who murdered John Gordon of Brackley, an event recorded in a ballad.  Farquharson took part in the Jacobite rising of 1689, defeating an attack on Braemar Castle.
Supposedly, he wished to be buried at Inverey and when buried instead at St Andrew's churchyard, Braemar, his coffin thrice resurfaced before that wish was granted.

Structure
The castle was a plain oblong house; whether it was vaulted is disputed. A portion of the east wall survived until the mid-20th century. Reference to it as a “castle” may exaggerate its importance.

See also
Castles in Great Britain and Ireland
List of castles in Scotland

References

Castles in Aberdeenshire